Sandia Park is a census-designated place  in Bernalillo County, New Mexico, United States. Its population was 237 as of the 2010 census. Sandia Park has a post office with ZIP code 87047.

Tinkertown Museum is an attraction in the area.

Demographics

Education
It is zoned to Albuquerque Public Schools.

References

Census-designated places in New Mexico
Census-designated places in Bernalillo County, New Mexico